Fishburn is a village and civil parish in County Durham, in England. It is situated about 12 miles west of Hartlepool.  It had a population of 2,454, increasing to 2,588 at the 2011 Census.

Location
The village lies scattered along a dry swell of magnesian limestone rising north from the River Skerne (known locally as the "beck") to approx. 500 ft above sea level. The beck is one of the parish boundaries, as the township of Sedgefield begins on the other side of the river.

History
The earliest proprietors of the village (and then manor) on record were the family of "Fissebourne". There are a number of theories on how the village got its name. In one book it is stated that the name derives from the Saxon words  "Fisc" meaning fish and " Bourne" meaning brook.
Another theory is that it was derived from the monks who used to fish at this spot in early days; hence "fish in the burn", Fishburn.
However it is more likely that the family of Fissebourne gave its name to the manor.
It could also be a Flemish name associated with the Norman Conquerors, i.e. Ranulf de Fishbourne. Old maps suggest that the village was named "Fissebourne" at one time, and then some considerable years later, it became "Fishbourne", later adopting its present name "Fishburn".

Coal mining
Between 1910 and 1973 coal mining here was a major industry, Fishburn Colliery employees peaking at over 1500 in the 1950s.

Fishburn coking plant was built in 1954 alongside the colliery to produce high grade coke for industry and a coke for the domestic market called Sunbrite as well as other byproducts from the coking process such as town gas which was supplied directly to the nearby Winterton Hospital and to the national grid.

After much doubt about its future and attempts by the then MP Tony Blair to save it, the plant was eventually closed in 1986 with the loss of 250 jobs. Nothing remains of the former ovens and the site has been reclaimed as a nature reserve.

Culture
Fishburn is home to the Fishburn Brass Band, started by local miners as the Fishburn Colliery Welfare band in the 1950s. The band have won several high-profile contests including the Scottish Open Champions in 2005 and the Durham County Brass Band League. The band also play on the streets of Fishburn on the day of the Durham Miners Gala and at Christmas playing traditional Christmas carols.

Fishburn appeared in the BBC TV genealogy series Who Do You Think You Are? featuring Tamzin Outhwaite, whose great-grandfather owned an ice cream shop on Chaytor Terrace.

Transport
Fishburn Airfield is a 600x30 metre grass strip runway catering for private flyers with light aircraft. The airfield hosted filming for a scene from the Bollywood film Hari Puttar: A Comedy of Terrors

Site of Special Scientific Interest
Fishburn Grasslands is an area north of the village. It has been designated a Site of Special Scientific Interest as the underlying magnesian limestone provides a habitat for rare species of plant life.

Notable people
Colin Cooper - Footballer and manager
Mike Hooper - Footballer
Micky Horswill - Footballer
Irving Nattrass - Newcastle United Midfielder
Paul Ward - Footballer
Niall Quinn Footballer
Bert Draycott - World Champion Spoons Player
David James Llewellyn Broadcaster

References

External links

Fishburn Airfield
Fishburn Brass Band
Fishburn Parish Council
Durham Mining Museum - Fishburn Colliery
Irving Nattrass Biography

Villages in County Durham